Zlataritsa  is a small town situated in the central northern part of Bulgaria, located in Veliko Tarnovo Province and close to the towns of Elena, Rodina, Lyaskovets, Strazhitsa and Antonovo. The city is the administrative center of the Zlataritsa Municipality. The climate of Zlataritsa is characteristic for its location north of the Balkan Mountains, which is typically continental. As of December 2009, the town has a population of 2,558 inhabitants.

Lunna Dolina (Moon Valley) is located in Ribartsi, within the Sredno Selo area of the Balkan Mountains. During the Second Bulgarian Empire when nearby Veliko Tarnovo was the capital of Bulgaria, Moon Valley may have been the summer residence of the ruling tsars. The local Church of St. Nicholas has recently been declared one of the Bulgarian Monuments of Culture. Three ancient settlements as well eight tombs from the 6th-7th millennium BC have been discovered in the vicinity, and fortress remains have been found in the Gradishte area of the municipality.

The Ancient Roman "Tsarigrad Road" passes to the south of the town. In the village of Gorsko Novo Selo a medieval church of 13th-14th century has been discovered, in addition to collections of coins reaching from the time from John Tzimiskes to Isaac II Angelos.
 
Zlataritsa, being sparsely populated, is an ideal location for the development of ecological tourism. The municipality is currently in the process of establishing an eco-trail following the town's river through a plethora of beautifully unspoilt natural sights. Its coordinates are

Gallery

References

External links
 Zlataritsa Municipality.

Towns in Bulgaria
Populated places in Veliko Tarnovo Province